was a Japanese kabuki and film actor. He appeared in more than 70 films between 1941 and 1980, directed by notable filmmakers such as Yasujirō Ozu, Kenji Mizoguchi, Akira Kurosawa, and Mikio Naruse.

Filmography

Film

Television

Honors
 1967 – Living National Treasure
 1968 – Medal with Purple Ribbon
 1974 – Order of the Sacred Treasure, 3rd class, Gold Rays with Neck Ribbon
 1980 – Person of Cultural Merit
 1983 – Order of the Sacred Treasure, 2nd class, Gold and Silver Star (posthumous)
 1983 – Senior fourth rank (posthumous)

References

External links

1902 births
1983 deaths
Japanese male film actors
Kabuki actors
Male actors from Osaka
20th-century Japanese male actors
Living National Treasures of Japan
Recipients of the Medal with Purple Ribbon
Recipients of the Order of the Sacred Treasure, 2nd class
Recipients of the Order of the Sacred Treasure, 3rd class
Persons of Cultural Merit